Tiszaladány is a village in Borsod-Abaúj-Zemplén County in northeastern Hungary.

Notable residents
Márkus Horovitz (1844-1919), rabbi and historian

References

Populated places in Borsod-Abaúj-Zemplén County